Illidiance is a industrial metal band from Taganrog, Russia, formed in 2004.

The Band was founded in 2004 as the successor of the black metal band S.C.A.R.D., which was active from 1999 to 2003. llidiance released an album and an EP, before switching to a more electronically influenced sound with their 2009 EP Synthetic Breed when they abandoned the black metal motives and oriented to the cyber metal genre. The band released their 4th studio album The Iconoclast on May 19, 2019 after over 8 years from their previous studio album Damage Theory.

Members
 Dmitry "Xyrohn" Shkurin — vocals, guitar
 Artem "Syrex" Shkurin — vocals, guitar
 Anton "Cyclonez" Brezhnev — drums
 Vyacheslav "Slay" — bass

Discography

Albums 
 Insane Mytheries To Demise (2005)
 Nexaeon (2009)
 Damage Theory (2010)
 The Iconoclast (2019)
 Oceanborn (Acoustic Album) (2022)

EPs 
 Withering Razors (2005)
 Cybergore Generation (2009)
 Synthetic Breed (2009)
 Deformity (2013)

Singles 
 New Millenium Crushers (2010)
 Neon Rabels (2012)
 Shockwave (2014)
 Modern Iconoclast (2016)
 Когда грянет гром (When There Is A Thunder) (2018)
 Последний рассвет (Last Dawn) (2018)
 Fuel from My Hate (2018)
 Out of Coverage (2018)
 The Witcher (2020)
 Breaking The Habit (2020)
 Open Your Eyes (2020)
 Hack the Hoax (feat. Jot Maxi from Hacktivist (band))

Compilations 
 Damage & Deform (2014)

External links 
Illidiance on last.fm
Illidiance on metalunderground
Official website

References 

Russian alternative metal musical groups
Russian melodic death metal musical groups
Industrial metal musical groups
Musical groups established in 2004